The 2002–03 Oklahoma Sooners men's basketball team represented the University of Oklahoma as a member of the Big 12 Conference during the 2002–03 NCAA Division I men's basketball season. The team was led by head coach Kelvin Sampson and played its home games in the Lloyd Noble Center. With high expectations entering the season, Oklahoma finished third in the Big 12 regular season standings behind Kansas and Texas. The Sooners won the Big 12 Conference tournament to earn the conference's automatic bid and a No. 1 seed in the NCAA tournament. After reaching the Elite Eight by beating , California, and Butler, the Sooners fell to No. 3 seed and eventual National champion Syracuse in the regional final to finish the season 27–7 (12–4 Big 12).

Roster

Schedule

|-
! colspan=9 style="background:#960018; color:#FFFDD0;"| Regular season

|-
! colspan=9 style="background:#960018; color:#FFFDD0;"| Big 12 tournament

|-
! colspan=9 style="background:#960018; color:#FFFDD0;"| NCAA tournament

Rankings

References

Oklahoma Sooners men's basketball seasons
Oklahoma
Oklahoma